Ceritrypetes is a genus of moths in the family Sesiidae.

Species
Ceritrypetes idiotropha  Bradley, 1956

References

Sesiidae